The Munich massacre was a terrorist attack carried out during the 1972 Summer Olympics in Munich, West Germany, by eight members of the Palestinian militant organization Black September, who infiltrated the Olympic Village, killed two members of the Israeli Olympic team, and took nine others hostage. Black September called the operation "Iqrit and Biram", after two Palestinian Christian villages whose inhabitants were expelled by the Israel Defense Forces (IDF) during the 1948 Arab-Israeli War. The Black September commander was Luttif Afif, who was also their negotiator. West German neo-Nazis gave the group logistical assistance.

Shortly after the hostages were taken, Afif demanded the release of 234 Palestinian prisoners who were being held in Israeli jails, plus the West German–imprisoned founders of the Red Army Faction, Andreas Baader and Ulrike Meinhof. West German police ambushed the terrorists, and killed five of the eight Black September members, but the rescue attempt failed and all of the hostages were killed. A West German policeman was also killed in the crossfire, and the West German government was criticized for the poor execution of its rescue attempt and its overall handling of the incident. The three surviving perpetrators were Adnan Al-Gashey, Jamal Al-Gashey, and Mohammed Safady, who were arrested, only to be released the next month in the hostage exchange that followed the hijacking of Lufthansa Flight 615. By then, the Israeli government had launched Operation Wrath of God, which authorized Mossad to track down and kill anyone who had played a role in the attack.

Two days prior to the start of the 2016 Summer Olympics, in a ceremony led by Brazilian and Israeli officials, the International Olympic Committee honored the eleven Israelis and one German who were killed at Munich. In the 2020 Summer Olympics, a moment of silence was observed in the opening ceremony.

Prelude
The hostages were taken during the second week of the 1972 Summer Olympics. The West German Olympic Organizing Committee had hoped to discard the military image of Germany. The Committee was wary of the image portrayed by the 1936 Summer Olympics, which Nazi dictator Adolf Hitler used for his propaganda. Security personnel known as Olys were inconspicuous, but were prepared to deal mostly with ticket fraud and drunkenness. The documentary film One Day in September claims that security in the athletes' village was unfit for the Games and that athletes could come and go as they pleased. Athletes could sneak past security, and go to other countries' rooms, by going over the fencing that encompassed the village.

The absence of armed personnel had worried Israeli delegation head Shmuel Lalkin even before his team arrived in Munich. In later interviews with journalists Serge Groussard and Aaron J. Klein, Lalkin said that he had expressed concern with the relevant authorities about his team's lodgings. The team was housed in a relatively isolated part of the Olympic Village, on the ground floor of a small building close to a gate, which Lalkin felt made his team particularly vulnerable to an outside assault. The West German authorities apparently assured Lalkin that extra security would be provided to look after the Israeli team, but Lalkin doubts that any additional measures were ever taken.

Olympic organizers asked West German forensic psychologist Georg Sieber to create 26 terrorism scenarios to aid the organizers in planning security. His "Situation 21" accurately forecast armed Palestinians invading the Israeli delegation's quarters, killing and taking hostages, and demanding Israel's release of prisoners and a plane to leave West Germany. Organizers balked against preparing for Situation 21 and the other scenarios, since guarding the Games against them would have gone against the goal of "Carefree Games" without heavy security.

Accusation of German foreknowledge of the attack
The German weekly news magazine Der Spiegel wrote in 2012 that West German authorities had a tip-off from a Palestinian informant in Beirut three weeks before the massacre. The informant told West Germany that Palestinians were planning an "incident" at the Olympic Games, and the Foreign Ministry in Bonn viewed the tip-off seriously enough to pass it to the secret service in Munich and urge that "all possible security measures" be taken.

However, according to Der Spiegel, the authorities failed to act on the tip, and had never acknowledged it in the following 40 years. The magazine said that this was only part of a 40-year cover-up by German authorities of the mishandling of its response to the massacre.

Hostage-taking
The attackers were reported to be Palestinian terrorists from refugee camps in Lebanon, Syria, and Jordan. They were identified as Luttif Afif (using the codename Issa), the leader (three of Issa's brothers were also reportedly members of Black September, two of them in Israeli jails), his deputy Yusuf Nazzal ("Tony"), and junior members Afif Ahmed Hamid ("Paolo"), Khalid Jawad ("Salah"), Ahmed Chic Thaa ("Abu Halla"), Mohammed Safady ("Badran"), Adnan Al-Gashey ("Denawi"), and Al-Gashey's cousin, Jamal Al-Gashey ("Samir").

According to author Simon Reeve, Afif (the son of a Jewish mother and Christian father), Nazzal and one of their confidantes had all worked in various capacities in the Olympic Village, and had spent a couple of weeks scouting for their potential target. A member of the Uruguayan Olympic delegation, which shared housing with the Israelis, claimed that he found Nazzal inside 31 Connollystraße less than 24 hours before the attack, but since he was recognized as a worker in the Village, nothing was thought of it at the time. The other members of the group entered Munich via train and plane in the days before the attack.

On Monday evening, 4 September, the Israeli athletes enjoyed a night out, watching a performance of Fiddler on the Roof and dining with the star of the play, Israeli actor Shmuel Rodensky, before returning to the Olympic Village. On the return trip in the team bus Lalkin denied his 13-year-old son—who had befriended weightlifter Yossef Romano and wrestler Eliezer Halfin—permission to spend the night in their apartment at Connollystraße 31, which may have saved the boy's life.

At 4:30 am local time on 5 September, as the athletes slept, eight tracksuit-clad members of the Black September faction of the Palestine Liberation Organization, carrying duffel bags loaded with AKM assault rifles, Tokarev pistols, and grenades, scaled a  chain-link fence with the assistance of unsuspecting athletes who were also sneaking into the Olympic Village. The athletes were originally identified as Americans, but were claimed to be Canadians decades later.

Once inside, the group used stolen keys to enter two apartments being used by the Israeli team at Connollystraße 31. Yossef Gutfreund, a wrestling referee, was awakened by a faint scratching noise at the door of Apartment 1, which housed the Israeli coaches and officials. When he investigated, he saw the door begin to open and masked men with guns on the other side. He shouted a warning to his sleeping roommates and threw his 135 kg (300 lb) weight against the door in an attempt to stop the intruders from forcing their way in. Gutfreund's actions gave his roommate, weightlifting coach Tuvia Sokolovsky, enough time to smash a window and escape. Wrestling coach Moshe Weinberg fought the intruders, who shot him through his cheek and then forced him to help them find more hostages.

Leading the intruders past Apartment 2, Weinberg lied by telling them that the residents of the apartment were not Israelis. Instead, Weinberg led them to Apartment 3, where the gunmen corralled six wrestlers and weightlifters as additional hostages. It is possible that Weinberg had hoped that the stronger men would have a better chance of fighting off the attackers than those in Apartment 2, but they were all surprised in their sleep.

As the athletes from Apartment 3 were marched back to the coaches' apartment, the wounded Weinberg again attacked the gunmen, allowing one of his wrestlers, Gad Tsobari, to escape via the underground parking garage. Weinberg knocked unconscious one of the intruders and slashed at another with a fruit knife but failed to draw blood before being shot to death.

Weightlifter Yossef Romano, a veteran of the 1967 Six-Day War, also attacked and wounded one of the intruders before being shot and killed. In its publication of 1 December 2015, The New York Times reported that Romano was castrated after he was shot.

The gunmen were left with nine hostages. They were, in addition to Gutfreund, shooting coach Kehat Shorr, track and field coach Amitzur Shapira, fencing master Andre Spitzer, weightlifting judge Yakov Springer, wrestlers Eliezer Halfin and Mark Slavin, and weightlifters David Berger and Ze'ev Friedman. Berger was an expatriate American with dual citizenship; Slavin, the youngest of the hostages at 18, had only arrived in Israel from the Soviet Union four months before the Olympic Games began. Gutfreund, physically the largest of the hostages, was bound to a chair (Groussard describes him as being tied up like a mummy); the rest were lined up four apiece on the two beds in Springer and Shapira's room, and bound at the wrists and ankles and then to each other. Romano's bullet-riddled corpse was left at his bound comrades' feet as a warning. Several of the hostages were beaten during the stand-off, with some suffering broken bones as a result.

Of the other members of Israel's team, racewalker Shaul Ladany had been jolted awake in Apartment 2 by Gutfreund's screams. He jumped from the second-story balcony of his room and fled to the American dormitory, awakening U.S. track coach Bill Bowerman and informing him of the attack. Ladany, a survivor of the Bergen-Belsen concentration camp, was the first person to spread the alert. The other four residents of Apartment 2 (shooters Henry Hershkowitz and Zelig Shtroch, fencers Dan Alon and Yehuda Weisenstein), plus chef de mission Shmuel Lalkin and the two team doctors, hid and eventually fled the besieged building. The two female members of Israel's Olympic team, sprinter and hurdler Esther Shahamorov and swimmer Shlomit Nir, were housed in a separate part of the Olympic Village.

Negotiations
The hostage-takers demanded the release of 234 Palestinians and non-Arabs jailed in Israel, along with two West German insurgents held by the West German penitentiary system, Andreas Baader and Ulrike Meinhof, who were founders of the West German Red Army Faction. The hostage-takers threw the body of Weinberg out of the front door of the residence to demonstrate their resolve. Israel's response was immediate and absolute: there would be no negotiation. Israel's official policy at the time was to refuse to negotiate with terrorists under any circumstances, as according to the Israeli government such negotiations would give an incentive to future attacks.

The German authorities, under the leadership of Chancellor Willy Brandt and Minister for the Interior Hans-Dietrich Genscher, rejected Israel's offer to send an Israeli special forces unit to West Germany. The Bavarian interior minister Bruno Merk, who headed the crisis centre jointly with Genscher and Munich's police chief Manfred Schreiber, denies that such an Israeli offer ever existed.

According to journalist John K. Cooley, the hostage situation presented an extremely difficult political situation for the Germans because the hostages were Jewish. Cooley reported that the Germans offered the Palestinians an unlimited amount of money for the release of the athletes, as well as the substitution by high-ranking Germans. However, the kidnappers refused both offers.

Munich police chief Manfred Schreiber, and Bruno Merk, interior minister of Bavaria, negotiated directly with the kidnappers, repeating the offer of an unlimited amount of money. According to Cooley, the reply was that "money means nothing to us; our lives mean nothing to us." Magdi Gohary and Mohammad Khadif, both Egyptian advisers to the Arab League, and A.D. Touny, an Egyptian member of the International Olympic Committee (IOC), also helped try to win concessions from the kidnappers, but to no avail. However, the negotiators apparently were able to convince the terrorists that their demands were being considered, as "Issa" granted a total of five deadline extensions. Elsewhere in the village, athletes carried on as normal, seemingly oblivious to the events unfolding nearby. The Games continued until mounting pressure on the IOC forced a suspension some 12 hours after the first athlete had been murdered. United States marathon runner Frank Shorter, observing the unfolding events from the balcony of his nearby lodging, was quoted as saying, "Imagine those poor guys over there. Every five minutes a psycho with a machine gun says, 'Let's kill 'em now,' and someone else says, 'No, let's wait a while.' How long could you stand that?"

At 4:30 pm, a squad of 38 West German police officers was dispatched to the Olympic Village. Dressed in Olympic sweatsuits (some also wearing Stahlhelme and carrying Walther MP sub-machine guns), they were members of the German border police, although according to former Munich policeman Heinz Hohensinn they were regular Munich police officers, with no experience in combat or hostage rescue. Their plan was to crawl down from the ventilation shafts and kill the terrorists. The police took up positions awaiting the codeword "Sunshine", which upon hearing, they were to begin the assault. In the meantime, camera crews filmed the actions of the officers from the German apartments, and broadcast the images live on television. Thus, the terrorists were able to watch the police prepare to attack. In the end, after "Issa" threatened to kill two of the hostages, the police retreated from the premises.

At one point during the crisis, the negotiators demanded direct contact with the hostages to satisfy themselves the Israelis were still alive. Fencing coach Andre Spitzer, who spoke fluent German, and shooting coach Kehat Shorr, the senior member of the Israeli delegation, had a brief conversation with West German officials while standing at the second-floor window of the besieged building, with two kidnappers holding guns on them. When Spitzer attempted to answer a question, he was clubbed with the butt of an AK-47 in full view of international television cameras and pulled away from the window. A few minutes later, Hans-Dietrich Genscher and Walter Tröger, the mayor of the Olympic Village, were briefly allowed into the apartments to speak with the hostages. Tröger spoke of being very moved by the dignity with which the Israelis held themselves, and that they seemed resigned to their fate.

Tröger noticed that several of the hostages, especially Gutfreund, showed signs of having suffered physical abuse at the hands of the kidnappers, and that David Berger had been shot in his left shoulder. While being debriefed by the crisis team, Genscher and Tröger told them that they had seen "four or five" attackers inside the apartment. Fatefully, these numbers were accepted as definitive. While Genscher and Tröger were talking with the hostages, Kehat Shorr had told the West Germans that the Palestinians would not object to being flown to an Arab country, provided that strict guarantees for their safety were made by the Germans and whichever nation they landed in.

Failed rescue

Ambush plan
The original West German plan was to offer to transport the terrorists and the hostages by plane to Cairo. Two Bell UH-1 military helicopters were to take them to nearby Fürstenfeldbruck, a NATO airbase. Initially, the perpetrators' plan was to go to Riem, which was the international airport near Munich at the time, but the negotiators convinced them that Fürstenfeldbruck would be more practical.

Realizing that the Palestinians and Israelis had to walk 200 metres through the underground garages to reach the helicopters, the West German police saw another opportunity to ambush the perpetrators, and placed sharpshooters there. But "Issa" insisted on checking the route first. He and some other Palestinians walked pointing their AK-47s at Schreiber, Tröger and Genscher. At that time, the police snipers were lying behind cars in the sidestreets, and when they approached the latter crawled away, making noise in the process. Thus the terrorists were immediately alerted of the dangerous presence, and they decided to use a bus instead of walking. The bus arrived at 10:00 pm and drove the contingent to the helicopters. "Issa" checked them with a flashlight before boarding in groups.

Five West German policemen were deployed around the airport in sniper roles—three on the roof of the control tower, one hidden behind a service truck and one behind a small signal tower at ground level. However, none of them had any special sniper training, nor any special weapon (being equipped with the H&K G3, the ordinary battle rifle of the German Armed Forces without optics or night vision devices). The officers were selected because they shot competitively on weekends. During a subsequent German investigation, an officer identified as "Sniper No. 2" stated: "I am of the opinion that I am not a sharpshooter."

The members of the crisis teamSchreiber, Genscher, Merk and Schreiber's deputy Georg Wolfsupervised and observed the attempted rescue from the airport control tower. Cooley, Reeve and Groussard all placed Mossad chief Zvi Zamir and Victor Cohen, one of Zamir's senior assistants, at the scene as well, but as observers only.

A Boeing 727 jet was positioned on the tarmac with sixteen West German police inside dressed as flight crew. It was agreed that "Issa" and "Tony" would inspect the plane. The plan was that the West Germans would overpower them as they boarded, giving the snipers a chance to kill the remaining terrorists at the helicopters.

Failure
At the last minute, as the helicopters were arriving at Fürstenfeldbruck, the West German police aboard the airplane decided it was too dangerous and voted to abandon their mission, without consulting the central command. This left only the five sharpshooters to try to overpower a larger and more heavily armed group. At that point, Colonel Ulrich Wegener, Genscher's senior aide and later the founder of the elite German counter-terrorist unit GSG 9, said "I'm sure this will blow the whole affair!".

The helicopters landed just after 10:30 pm and the four pilots and six of the kidnappers emerged. While four of the Black September members held the pilots at gunpoint (breaking an earlier promise that they would not take any Germans hostage), Issa and Tony walked over to inspect the jet, only to find it empty. Realizing they had been lured into a trap, they sprinted back toward the helicopters. As they ran past the control tower, Sniper 3 took one last opportunity to eliminate "Issa", which would have left the group leaderless. However, due to the poor lighting, he struggled to see his target and missed, hitting "Tony" in the thigh instead. Meanwhile, the West German authorities gave the order for snipers positioned nearby to open fire, which occurred around 11:00 pm.

In the ensuing chaos, Ahmed Chic Thaa and Afif Ahmed Hamid, the two kidnappers holding the helicopter pilots, were killed while the remaining gunmensome possibly already woundedscrambled to safety, returning fire from behind and beneath the helicopters, out of the snipers' line of sight, shooting out many of the airport lights. A West German policeman in the control tower, Anton Fliegerbauer, was killed by the gunfire. The helicopter pilots fled; the hostages, tied up inside the crafts, could not. During the gun battle, the hostages secretly worked on loosening their bonds and teethmarks were found on some of the ropes after the gunfire had ended.

Massacre
The West Germans had not arranged for armored personnel carriers ahead of time and only at this point were they called in to break the deadlock. Since the roads to the airport had not been cleared, the carriers became stuck in traffic and finally arrived around midnight. With their appearance, the kidnappers felt the shift in the status quo, and possibly panicked at the thought of the failure of their operation.

At four minutes past midnight of 6 September, one of the terrorists (likely Issa) turned on the hostages in the eastern helicopter and fired at them with a Kalashnikov assault rifle from point-blank range. Springer, Halfin and Friedman were killed instantly; Berger, shot twice in the leg, is believed to have survived the initial onslaught (as his autopsy later found that he had died of smoke inhalation). The attacker then pulled the pin on a hand grenade and tossed it into the cockpit; the ensuing explosion destroyed the helicopter and incinerated the bound Israelis inside.

Issa then dashed across the tarmac and began firing at the police, who killed him with return fire. Another, Khalid Jawad, attempted to escape and was gunned down by one of the snipers. What happened to the remaining hostages is still a matter of dispute. A German police investigation indicated that one of their snipers and a few of the hostages may have been shot inadvertently by the police. However, a Time magazine reconstruction of the long-suppressed Bavarian prosecutor's report indicates that a third kidnapper (Reeve identifies Adnan Al-Gashey) stood at the door of the western helicopter and raked the remaining five hostages with machine gun fire; Gutfreund, Shorr, Slavin, Spitzer and Shapira were shot an average of four times each.

Of the four hostages in the eastern helicopter, only Ze'ev Friedman's body was relatively intact; he had been blown clear of the helicopter by the explosion. In some cases, the exact cause of death for the hostages in the eastern helicopter was difficult to establish because the rest of the corpses were burned almost beyond recognition in the explosion and subsequent fire.

Three of the remaining terrorists lay on the ground, one of them feigning death, and were captured by police. Jamal Al-Gashey had been shot through his right wrist, and Mohammed Safady had sustained a flesh wound to his leg. Adnan Al-Gashey had escaped injury completely. Yusuf Nazzal ("Tony") escaped the scene, but was tracked down with police dogs 40 minutes later in an airbase parking lot. Cornered and bombarded with tear gas, he was shot dead after a brief gunfight. By around 1:30 am on 6 September, the battle was over.

Outcome
Initial news reports, published all over the world, indicated that all the hostages were alive, and that all the attackers had been killed. Only later did a representative for the International Olympic Committee (IOC) suggest that "initial reports were overly optimistic." Jim McKay, who was covering the Olympics that year for the American Broadcasting Company (ABC), had taken on the job of reporting the events as Roone Arledge fed them into his earpiece. At 3:24 am, McKay received the official confirmation:

Several sources listed Ladany as having been killed. Ladany recalled later:

Criticism
Author Simon Reeve, among others, writes that the shootout with the well-trained Black September members showed an egregious lack of preparation on the part of the German authorities. They were not prepared to deal with this sort of situation. This costly lesson led directly to the founding, less than two months later, of police counter-terrorism branch GSG 9. German authorities made a number of mistakes. First, because of restrictions in the post-war West German constitution, the army could not participate in the attempted rescue, as the German armed forces are not allowed to operate inside Germany during peacetime. The responsibility was entirely in the hands of the Munich police and the Bavarian authorities.

It was known a half-hour before the hostages and kidnappers had even arrived at Fürstenfeldbruck that the number of the latter was larger than first believed. Despite this new information, Schreiber decided to continue with the rescue operation as originally planned and the new information could not reach the snipers since they had no radios.

It is a basic tenet of sniping operations that there are enough snipers (at least two for each known target, or in this case a minimum of ten) deployed to neutralize as many of the attackers as possible with the first volley of shots. The 2006 National Geographic Channel's Seconds From Disaster profile on the massacre stated that the helicopters were supposed to land sideways and to the west of the control tower, a maneuver which would have allowed the snipers clear shots into them as the kidnappers threw open the helicopter doors. Instead, the helicopters were landed facing the control tower and at the centre of the airstrip. This not only gave them a place to hide after the gunfight began, but put Snipers 1 and 2 in the line of fire of the other three snipers on the control tower.

According to the same program, the crisis committee delegated to make decisions on how to deal with the incident consisted of Bruno Merk (the Bavarian interior minister), Hans-Dietrich Genscher (the West German interior minister) and Manfred Schreiber (Munich's Chief of Police); in other words, two politicians and one tactician. The program mentioned that a year before the Games, Schreiber had participated in another hostage crisis (a failed bank robbery) in which he ordered a marksman to shoot one of the perpetrators, managing only to wound the robber. As a result, the robbers shot an innocent woman dead. Schreiber was consequently charged with involuntary manslaughter.

As mentioned earlier, the five German snipers at Fürstenfeldbruck did not have radio contact with one another (nor with the German authorities conducting the rescue operation) and therefore were unable to coordinate their fire. The only contact the snipers had with the operational leadership was with Georg Wolf, who was lying next to the three snipers on the control tower giving orders directly to them. The two snipers at ground level had been given vague instructions to shoot when the other snipers began shooting, and were basically left to fend for themselves.

In addition, the snipers did not have the proper equipment for this hostage rescue operation. The Heckler & Koch G3 battle rifles used were considered by several experts to be inadequate for the distance at which the snipers were trying to shoot. The G3, the standard service rifle of the Bundeswehr at that time, had a  barrel; at the distances the snipers were required to shoot, a  barrel would have ensured far greater accuracy. None of the rifles were equipped with telescopic or infrared sights. Additionally, none of the snipers were equipped with a steel helmet or bullet-proof vest. No armored vehicles were at the scene at Fürstenfeldbruck, and were only called in after the gunfight was well underway.

There were also numerous tactical errors. As mentioned earlier, "Sniper 2", who was stationed behind the signal tower, wound up directly in the line of fire of his fellow snipers on the control tower, without any protective gear and without any other police being aware of his location. Because of this, "Sniper 2" didn't fire a single shot until late in the gunfight, when hostage-taker Khalid Jawad attempted to escape on foot and ran right at the exposed sniper. "Sniper 2" killed the fleeing perpetrator but was in turn badly wounded by a fellow police officer, who was unaware that he was shooting at one of his own men. One of the helicopter pilots, Gunnar Ebel, was lying near "Sniper 2" and was also wounded by friendly fire. Both Ebel and the sniper recovered from their injuries.

Many of the errors made by the Germans during the rescue attempt were ultimately detailed by Heinz Hohensinn, who had participated in Operation Sunshine earlier that day. He stated in One Day in September that he had been selected to pose as a crew member. He and his fellow policemen understood that it was a suicide mission, so the group unanimously voted to flee the plane. None of them were reprimanded for that desertion.

Aftermath
The bodies of the five Palestinian attackers—Afif, Nazzal, Chic Thaa, Hamid and Jawad—killed during the Fürstenfeldbruck gun battle were delivered to Libya, where they received heroes' funerals and were buried with full military honours. On 8 September, Israeli planes bombed ten PLO bases in Syria and Lebanon in response to the massacre, killing a reported 200 militants and 11 civilians.

The three surviving Black September gunmen had been arrested after the Fürstenfeldbruck gunfight, and were being held in a Munich prison for trial. On 29 October, Lufthansa Flight 615 was hijacked and threatened to be blown up if the Munich attackers were not released. Safady and the Al-Gasheys were immediately released by West Germany, receiving a tumultuous welcome when they touched down in Libya and (as seen in One Day in September) giving their own firsthand account of their operation at a press conference broadcast worldwide.

Further international investigations into the Lufthansa Flight 615 incident have produced theories of a secret agreement between the German government and Black September release of the surviving terrorists in exchange for assurances of no further attacks on Germany.

Effect on the Games
In the wake of the hostage-taking, competition was suspended for 34 hours, for the first time in modern Olympic history, after public criticism of the Olympic Committee's decision to continue the games. On 6 September, a memorial service attended by 80,000 spectators and 3,000 athletes was held in the Olympic Stadium. IOC President Avery Brundage made little reference to the murdered athletes during a speech praising the strength of the Olympic movement and equating the attack on the Israeli sportsmen with the recent arguments about encroaching professionalism and disallowing Rhodesia's participation in the Games, which outraged many listeners. The victims' families were represented by Andre Spitzer's widow Ankie, Moshe Weinberg's mother, and a cousin of Weinberg, Carmel Eliash. During the memorial service, Eliash collapsed and died of a heart attack.

Many of the 80,000 people who filled the Olympic Stadium for West Germany's football match with Hungary carried noisemakers and waved flags, but when several spectators unfurled a banner reading "17 dead, already forgotten?" security officers removed the sign and expelled those responsible from the grounds. During the memorial service, the Olympic Flag was flown at half-staff, along with the flags of most of the other competing nations at the request of Willy Brandt. Ten Arab nations objected to their flags flying at half-staff and the mandate was rescinded.

Willi Daume, president of the Munich organizing committee, initially sought to cancel the remainder of the Games, but in the afternoon Brundage and others who wished to continue the Games prevailed, stating that they could not let the incident halt the Games. Brundage stated "The Games must go on, and we must ... and we must continue our efforts to keep them clean, pure and honest." The decision was endorsed by the Israeli government and Israeli Olympic team chef de mission Shmuel Lalkin.

On 6 September, after the memorial service, the remaining members of the Israeli team withdrew from the Games and left Munich. All Jewish sportsmen were placed under guard. Mark Spitz, the American swimming star who had already completed his competitions, left Munich during the hostage crisis (it was feared that as a prominent Jew, Spitz might be a kidnapping target). The Egyptian team left the Games on 7 September, stating they feared reprisals. The Philippine and Algerian teams also left the Games, as did some members of the Dutch and Norwegian teams. American marathon runner Kenny Moore, who wrote about the incident for Sports Illustrated, quoted Dutch distance runner Jos Hermens as saying "It's quite simple. We were invited to a party, and if someone comes to the party and shoots people, how can you stay?" Dutch sprinter Wilma van Gool had qualified for the semifinals in the 200 m sprint; the time that she ran in the quarterfinals was faster than quarterfinals time of the eventual gold medal winner, Renate Stecher of East Germany. However, she withdrew from the competition in sympathy with the Israeli victims. She said that she was leaving in protest of the "obscene" decision to continue with the Olympic Games. Many athletes, dazed by the tragedy, similarly felt that their desire to compete had been destroyed, although they stayed at the Games.

Four years later at the 1976 Summer Olympics in Montreal, the Israeli team commemorated the massacre: when they entered the stadium at the Opening Ceremony, their national flag was adorned with a black ribbon.

The families of some victims have asked the IOC to establish a permanent memorial to the athletes. The IOC has declined, saying that to introduce a specific reference to the victims could "alienate other members of the Olympic community," according to the BBC. Alex Gilady, an Israeli IOC official, told the BBC: "We must consider what this could do to other members of the delegations that are hostile to Israel."

The IOC rejected an international campaign in support of a minute of silence at the Opening Ceremony of the 2012 London Olympics in honour of the Israeli victims on the 40th anniversary of the massacre. Jacques Rogge, the IOC President, said it would be "inappropriate," although the opening ceremony included a memorium for the victims of the 7 July 2005 London bombings. Speaking of the decision, Olympian Shaul Ladany, who survived the attack, commented: "I do not understand. I do not understand, and I do not accept it."

In 2014 the International Olympic Committee agreed to contribute $250,000 towards a memorial to the murdered Israeli athletes. After 44 years, the IOC commemorated the victims of the Munich massacre for the first time in the Rio 2016 Olympic Village on 4 August 2016.

There is a memorial outside the Olympic stadium in Munich in the form of a stone tablet at the bridge linking the stadium to the former Olympic village. There is a memorial tablet to the slain Israelis outside the front door of their former lodging at 31 Connollystraße. On 15 October 1999 (almost a year before the Sydney 2000 Games), a memorial plaque was unveiled in one of the large light towers (Tower 14) outside the Sydney Olympic Stadium.

In the 2020 Summer Olympics, a moment of silence was observed in the opening ceremony in 2021, a year before its 50th anniversary. This was the first time in history this happened in the opening ceremony.

International reactions
King Hussein of Jordan, the only leader of an Arab country to denounce the attack publicly, called it a "savage crime against civilization ... perpetrated by sick minds."

U.S. President Richard Nixon privately discussed a number of possible American responses, such as declaring a national day of mourning (favored by Secretary of State William P. Rogers), or having Nixon fly to the athletes' funerals. Nixon and U.S National Security Advisor Henry Kissinger decided instead to press the United Nations to take steps against international terrorism.

Israeli response

On 5 September, Golda Meir, Prime Minister of Israel, appealed to other countries to "save our citizens and condemn the unspeakable criminal acts committed." She also stated, "if we [Israel] should give in, then no Israeli anywhere in the world shall feel that his life is safe... it's blackmail of the worst kind."

Meir and the Israeli Defense Committee secretly authorized Mossad to track down and kill those allegedly responsible for the Munich massacre. The accusation that this was motivated by a desire for vengeance was disputed by Zvi Zamir, who described the mission as "putting an end to the type of terror that was perpetrated" in Europe. To this end Mossad set up a number of special teams to locate and kill these fedayeen, aided by the agency's stations in Europe.

In a February 2006 interview, Zamir answered direct questions:

The Israeli mission later became known as Operation Wrath of God or Mivtza Za'am Ha'El. Reeve quotes General Aharon Yariv—who, he writes, was the general overseer of the operation—as stating that after Munich the Israeli government felt it had no alternative but to exact justice.

Benny Morris writes that a target list was created using information from "turned" PLO personnel and friendly European intelligence services. Once completed, a wave of assassinations of suspected Black September operatives began across Europe. On 9 April 1973, Israel launched Operation "Spring of Youth", a joint Mossad–IDF operation in Beirut. The targets were Mohammad Yusuf al-Najjar (Abu Yusuf), head of Fatah's intelligence arm, which ran Black September, according to Morris; Kamal Adwan, who headed the PLO's Western Sector, which controlled PLO action inside Israel; and Kamal Nassir, the PLO spokesman. A group of Sayeret commandos were taken in nine missile boats and a small fleet of patrol boats to a deserted Lebanese beach, before driving in two cars to downtown Beirut, where they killed Najjar, Adwan and Nassir. Two further detachments of commandos blew up the PFLP's headquarters in Beirut and a Fatah explosives plant. The leader of the commando team that conducted the operations was Ehud Barak.

On 21 July 1973, in the Lillehammer affair, a team of Mossad agents mistakenly killed Ahmed Bouchiki, a Moroccan man unrelated to the Munich attack, in Lillehammer, Norway, after an informant mistakenly said Bouchiki was Ali Hassan Salameh, the head of Force 17 and a Black September operative. Five Mossad agents, including two women, were captured by the Norwegian authorities, while others managed to slip away. The five were convicted of the killing and imprisoned, but were released and returned to Israel in 1975. Mossad later found Ali Hassan Salameh in Beirut and killed him on 22 January 1979 with a remote-controlled car bomb. The attack killed four passersby and injured 18 others. According to CIA officer Duane "Dewey" Claridge, chief of operations of the CIA Near East Division from 1975 to 1978, in mid-1976, Salameh offered Americans assistance and protection with Arafat's blessings during the American embassy pull-out from Beirut during the down-spiraling chaos of the Lebanese Civil War. There was a general feeling that Americans could be trusted. However, the scene of cooperation came to an end abruptly after the assassination of Salameh. Americans were generally blamed as Israel's principal benefactors.

Simon Reeve writes that the Israeli operations continued for more than twenty years. He details the assassination in Paris in 1992 of Atef Bseiso, the PLO's head of intelligence, and says that an Israeli general confirmed there was a link back to Munich. Reeve also writes that while Israeli officials have stated Operation Wrath of God was intended to exact vengeance for the families of the athletes killed in Munich, "few relatives wanted such a violent reckoning with the Palestinians." Reeve states the families were instead desperate to know the truth of the events surrounding the Munich massacre. Reeve outlines what he sees as a lengthy cover-up by German authorities to hide the truth. After a lengthy court fight, in 2004 the families of the Munich victims reached a settlement of €3 million with the German government.

Alleged German cover-up
An article in 2012 in a front-page story of the German news magazine Der Spiegel reported that much of the information pertaining to the mishandling of the massacre was covered up by the German authorities. For twenty years, Germany refused to release any information about the attack and did not accept responsibility for the results. The magazine reported that the government had been hiding 3,808 files, which contained tens of thousands of documents. Der Spiegel said it obtained secret reports by authorities, embassy cables, and minutes of cabinet meetings that demonstrate the lack of professionalism of the German officials in handling the massacre. The newspaper also wrote that the German authorities were told that Palestinians were planning an "incident" at the Olympics three weeks before the massacre, but failed to take the necessary security measures, and these facts are missing from the official documentation of the German government.

In August 2012, Der Spiegel reported that following the massacre, Germany began secret meetings with Black September, at the behest of the West German government, due to the fear that Black September would carry out other terrorist attacks in Germany. The government proposed a clandestine meeting between German Foreign Minister Walter Scheel and a member of Black September to create a "new basis of trust." In return for an exchange of the political status of the Palestine Liberation Organization, the PLO would stop terrorist attacks on German soil. When French police arrested Abu Daoud, one of the chief organizers of the Munich massacre, and inquired about extraditing him to Germany, Bavaria's justice secretary  recommended that Germany should not take any action, causing the French to release Abu Daoud and the Assad regime to shelter him until he died at a Damascus hospital in 2010.

Surviving Black September members
Two of the three surviving gunmen, Mohammed Safady and Adnan Al-Gashey, were allegedly killed by Mossad as part of Operation Wrath of God. Al-Gashey was allegedly located after making contact with a cousin in a Gulf State, and Safady was found by remaining in touch with family in Lebanon. This account was challenged in a book by Aaron J. Klein, who claims that Al-Gashey died of heart failure in the 1970s, and that Safady was killed by Christian Phalangists in Lebanon in the early 1980s. However, in July 2005, PLO veteran Tawfiq Tirawi told Klein that Safady, whom Tirawi claimed as a close friend, was "as alive as you are."

The third surviving gunman, Jamal Al-Gashey, was known to be alive as of 1999, hiding in North Africa or in Syria, claiming to still fear retribution from Israel. He is the only one of the surviving terrorists to consent to interviews since 1972, having granted an interview in 1992 to a Palestinian newspaper, and having briefly emerged from hiding in 1999 to participate in an interview for the film One Day in September, during which he was disguised and his face shown only in blurry shadow.

Abu Daoud
Of those believed to have planned the massacre, only Abu Daoud, the man who claimed that the attack was his idea, is known to have died of natural causes. Historical documents released to Der Spiegel by the German secret service show that Dortmund police had been aware of collaboration between Abu Daoud and neo-Nazi  ( E. W. Pless and, since 1979, officially named Willi Voss) seven weeks before the attack. In January 1977, Abu Daoud was intercepted by French police in Paris while traveling from Beirut under an assumed name. Under protest from the PLO, Iraq, and Libya, who claimed that because Abu Daoud was traveling to a PLO comrade's funeral he should receive diplomatic immunity, the French government refused a West German extradition request on grounds that forms had not been filled in properly, and put him on a plane to Algeria before Germany could submit another request.

Abu Daoud was allowed safe passage through Israel in 1996 so he could attend a PLO meeting convened in the Gaza Strip for the purpose of rescinding an article in its charter that called for Israel's eradication. In his autobiography, From Jerusalem to Munich, first published in France in 1999, and later in a written interview with Sports Illustrated, Abu Daoud wrote that funds for Munich were provided by Mahmoud Abbas, Chairman of the PLO since 11 November 2004 and President of the Palestinian National Authority since 15 January 2005.

Abu Daoud believed that if the Israelis knew that Mahmoud Abbas was the financier of the operation, the 1993 Oslo Accords would not have been achieved, during which Mahmoud Abbas was seen in photo ops at the White House.

Ankie Spitzer, widow of fencing coach and Munich victim Andre, declined several offers to meet with Abu Daoud, saying that the only place she wants to meet him is in a courtroom. According to Spitzer, "He [Abu Daoud] didn't pay the price for what he did." In 2006, during the release of Steven Spielberg's film Munich, Der Spiegel interviewed Abu Daoud regarding the Munich massacre. He was quoted as saying: "I regret nothing. You can only dream that I would apologize."

Daoud died of kidney failure on 3 July 2010 in Damascus, Syria.

List of fatalities

 Shot during the initial break-in
 Moshe Weinberg, wrestling coach
 Yossef Romano, weightlifter

 Shot and killed by grenade in eastern-side helicopter D-HAQO
 According to the order in which they were seated, from left to right:
 Ze'ev Friedman, weightlifter
 David Berger, weightlifter (survived grenade but died of smoke inhalation)
 Yakov Springer, weightlifting judge
 Eliezer Halfin, wrestler

 Shot in western-side helicopter D-HAQU
 According to the order in which they were seated, from left to right:
 Yossef Gutfreund, wrestling referee
 Kehat Shorr, shooting coach
 Mark Slavin, wrestler
 Andre Spitzer, fencing coach
 Amitzur Shapira, track coach

 Shot in control tower during gunfight
 Anton Fliegerbauer, West German police officer

 Palestinian terrorists shot dead by West German police
 Luttif Afif ("Issa")
 Yusuf Nazzal ("Tony")
 Afif Ahmed Hamid ("Paolo")
 Khalid Jawad ("Salah")
 Ahmed Chic Thaa ("Abu Halla")

Early life and memorial for Anton Fliegerbauer

Fliegerbauer was born in Westerndorf, Lower Bavaria and grew up on a farm with his two siblings. He originally attended Agricultural school before taking up an apprenticeship with the Bavarian State Police. Fliegerbauer was appointed as police officer of the Municipal Police Munich to the rank "Polizeiobermeister" (Policeuppermaster) on 19 November 1970. In 1964 he met his future wife who he then married in 1966 and two years later they had a son, Alfred.

During the 1972 Munich Olympic Games, Fliegerbauer was assigned to a riot police unit.

Fliegerbauer was buried on 8 September after a "well attended" civic funeral attended by the Mayor of Munich Georg Kronawitter and Prime Minister of Bavaria Alfons Goppel with wreaths laid on behalf of West German Chancellor Willy Brandt and West German President Gustav Heinemann.

In a memorial service held at Fürstenfeldbruck Air Base in 2012, commemorating the 40th anniversary of the Munich massacre, Fliegerbauer was remembered alongside the eleven members of the Israeli delegation slain by the terrorists.

During 2016 Fliegerbauer was memorialized at the Olympic Village in Brazil.

On the memorial to the massacre erected at Olympiapark (Munich), Fliegerbauer is described in a sentence that reads, "The police failed in this attempt, and the operation ended in disaster. All of the hostages and the German police officer Anton Fliegerbauer, as well as five of the terrorists, died."

Memorials gallery

Media

 1972, film by Sarah Morris
 21 Hours at Munich, a made for TV drama
 Munich, a 2005 American-Canadian film by Steven Spielberg
 Munich: Mossad's Revenge, a television documentary on Britain's Channel 4
 One Day in September, 1999 documentary by Kevin Macdonald; winner of the Academy Award for Best Documentary
 Seconds From Disaster episodes on National Geographic
 Sword of Gideon, Canadian television film
 Visions of Eight, American documentary
 Munich 1972 & Beyond, 2016 documentary film by Steven Ungerleider

See also

 GSG9, the tactical unit of the German Federal Police, which was founded as a result of the massacre
 Israeli casualties of war
 Lod Airport massacre
 One minute of silence
 Palestinian political violence

References

Further reading
 Blumenau, Bernhard (Basingstoke 2014), The United Nations and Terrorism. Germany, Multilateralism, and Antiterrorism Efforts in the 1970s Palgrave Macmillan, ch. 2. .
 Calahan, A. B. "The Israeli Response to the 1972 Munich Olympic Massacre and the Development of Independent Covert Action Teams" (1995 thesis)
 Cooley, John K. (London 1973), Green March Black September: The Story of the Palestinian Arabs 
 Dahlke, Matthias (Munich 2006), Der Anschlag auf Olympia '72. Die politischen Reaktionen auf den internationalen in Deutschland Martin Meidenbauer  (German text)
 Daoud, Abu, (New York, 2002), Palestine : a history of the resistance movement by the sole survivor of Black September 
 Groussard, Serge (New York, 1975), The Blood of Israel: the massacre of the Israeli athletes, the Olympics, 1972 
 Jonas, George. (New York, 2005), Vengeance: The True Story of an Israeli Team., Simon & Schuster
 Khalaf, Salah (Abu Iyad) (Tel Aviv, 1983) Without a Homeland: Conversations with Eric Rouleau
 Klein, A. J. (New York, 2005), Striking Back: The 1972 Munich Olympics Massacre and Israel's Deadly Response, Random House 
 Large, David Clay (Lanham, MD, 2012), Munich 1972, Rowman & Littlefield 
 Morris, Benny. (New York, 1999 and 2001), Righteous Victims: A History of the Zionist–Arab conflict, 1881–2000, Vintage Books edition 
 Reeve, Simon. (New York, 2001), One Day in September: the full story of the 1972 Munich Olympic massacre and Israeli revenge operation "Wrath of God" 
 Tinnin, David B. & Dag Christensen. (1976), The Hit Team 
 Yossi Melman, (17 February 2006), Interview with former Head of Mossad, Zvi Zamir, Haaretz
 Mohammad Daoud Odeh (August 2008), interview with NOX magazine, "Rings Of Fire"
 Kramer, Ferdinand: Das Attentat von München. In: Alois Schmid, Katharina Weigand: Bayern nach Jahr und Tag. 24 Tage aus der Bayerischen Geschichte. C. H. Beck Verlag, München 2007, . p. 400–414.
 Wolfgang Kraushaar: "Wann endlich beginnt bei Euch der Kampf gegen die heilige Kuh Israel?" München 1970: über die antisemitischen Wurzeln des deutschen Terrorismus. Rowohlt, Reinbek 2013, p. 496–573.

External links

 The Israeli Response to the 1972 Munich Massacre – Includes an extensive overview of the Munich massacre
 A Tribute to the 1972 Israeli Olympic Athletes – Includes biographies and photographs for each of the 11 Israeli athletes killed
 MunichOlympics.com – Tribute site including photos and short biographies
 Time Magazine, 4 December 2005
 Special Publication of Israel State Archives: The Fortieth Anniversary of the Massacre of the Israeli Athletes in Munich

 
1972 murders in Germany
1972 in international relations
1972 in Israel
1972 in West Germany
Mass murder in 1972
Massacre
1972 mass shootings in Europe
20th-century mass murder in Germany
Antisemitism in Germany
Antisemitism in Egypt
Israeli–Palestinian conflict
Black September Organization
Cold War history of Germany
Deaths by firearm in Germany
Israel–West Germany relations
Germany–Israel relations
Hostage taking in Germany
Israel at the Summer Olympics
Jewish sports
Kidnappings in Germany
Massacres in Germany
Massacres in 1972
Military operations involving the PLO
Massacre
Olympic deaths
Olympic Games controversies
Palestinian terrorist incidents in Germany
Politics and sports
September 1972 crimes
September 1972 events in Europe
Sports-related accidents and incidents
Terrorist attacks attributed to Palestinian militant groups
Terrorist incidents in Bavaria
Terrorist incidents in Europe in 1972
Terrorist incidents in Germany in the 1970s
Terrorist incidents in Germany in 1972